Cambridge SCA (Cambridge Student Community Action) is a registered charity which encourages and provides community volunteering opportunities for the students of the University of Cambridge. Projects typically provide services to disadvantaged groups within the local community and provide students with valuable learning opportunities and a chance to make a difference. Cambridge SCA runs 10 of its own 'Internal Projects', each of which are headed by student Project Leaders - these projects include 'Big Siblings', 'Parklife', 'Betty Stubbens Musical Entertainment Group' and 'Teaching English as a Second Language'. They also offer volunteering opportunities with over 60 external organisations, such as Cambridge Carbon Footprint, Headway and the Cambridge Rape Crisis Centre.

History
Cambridge SCA became a registered charity in 1972 and has been providing volunteers into the community throughout; with experience of almost 40 years, it is one of the longest-running student charity organisations affiliated to the University of Cambridge.

Organisation
SCA is run by a student committee, a board of trustees, three of whom are from the student committee, and a body of College Reps. Project Leaders are responsible for the delivery of their own projects, but are supported by the student committee. There are also two staff members who deal with the day-to-day running of the charity and are the first point of call for volunteers, committee members or those in the community wanting to be helped by SCA projects.

Elections onto the student committee take place at the Annual General Meeting, which is held at the end of Cambridge's Lent term.

Internal projects
Cambridge SCA run 10 of their own projects. Students can volunteer with children through 'Big Siblings', 'Bounce', 'Parklife' and 'Craftroom'. Educational projects include 'Homework Help' and 'Teaching English as a Second Language'. Projects with elderly people are 'Betty Stubbens Musical Entertainment Group', 'Saturday Club' and 'Sunday Club'. There is also 'Taskforce' which provides sporadic one-off volunteering events when the need arises.

External projects
SCA is linked up with many external organisations, which provides a wide choice of volunteering opportunities for Cambridge volunteers. Arts Projects include the Cambridge Music Education and Outreach Group and Libra Theatre Company. External Children's Projects include the Scouts and Girlguides. Education Projects includes Cambridge Hands On Science (CHaOS), READ International and YMCA New Deal Provision for unemployed adults. Environmental Projects include the Botanical Gardens Education Programme, Cambridge Carbon Footprint and Cambridge Preservation Society. Healthcare Projects include Arthur Rank House, a local hospice, CAM-MIND, DHIVerse and Umbrella Autism. Projects with the Elderly include CONTACT and the St Martin's Centre. SCA also links up volunteers with many other miscellaneous organisations, such as Cambridge University Student Action For Refugees (STAR), Cambridge Women and Homelessness Group, Jimmy's Night Shelter and SOS Children's Villages.

References

External links
 

Clubs and societies of the University of Cambridge
Organisations based in Cambridge
Charities based in Cambridgeshire